Tadashi Negishi (22 August 1912 – 16 December 1985) was a Japanese rower. He competed in the men's eight event at the 1936 Summer Olympics.

References

1912 births
1985 deaths
Japanese male rowers
Olympic rowers of Japan
Rowers at the 1936 Summer Olympics
Sportspeople from Tokyo